Alexander Kucheryavenko (born August 27, 1987) is a Russian professional ice hockey centre. He is currently playing for Dynamo Saint Petersburg of the Supreme Hockey League (VHL).

Kucheryavenko made his KHL debut playing with SKA Saint Petersburg during the inaugural 2008–09 KHL season.

References

External links

1987 births
Living people
Avangard Omsk players
Avtomobilist Yekaterinburg players
HC Dynamo Moscow players
HC Neftekhimik Nizhnekamsk players
People from Belgorod
Russian ice hockey centres
Salavat Yulaev Ufa players
SKA Saint Petersburg players
HC Spartak Moscow players
HC Vityaz players
Sportspeople from Belgorod Oblast